Edward Causton (27 November 1876 — 18 April 1957) was an English cricketer who played for Hampshire. He was born in Hammersmith and died in Torquay.

Causton made a single first-class appearance for the side, during the 1919 season, against Essex. From the lower-middle order, he scored 21 runs in the only innings in which he batted.

Causton bowled a single over in the match, conceding four runs.

External links
Edward Causton at Cricket Archive 

1876 births
1957 deaths
English cricketers
Hampshire cricketers